Pollanisus cyanota is a moth of the family Zygaenidae. It is found in Australia in south-eastern Queensland, New South Wales and Victoria.

The length of the forewings is 6–6.5 mm for males and females. There are two generations per year.

Adults are metallic dark green with pale speckles.

External links
Australian Faunal Directory
Zygaenid moths of Australia: a revision of the Australian Zygaenidae
Australian Insects

Moths of Australia
cyanota
Moths described in 1886